William Stepney Rawson (14 October 1854 – 4 November 1932) was an amateur footballer who played at full-back in the 1870s, and was also an FA Cup Final referee in 1876. Born in South Africa, he played for the England national team.

Early life and sports career
 
Rawson was born in Cape Town, South Africa, the son of Rawson W. Rawson and  Sophia Mary Anne Ward. He attended Westminster School in London, representing the school at "soccer" in 1872 and 1873, becoming captain in his final year.

He then went up to Christ Church, Oxford, in 1873, winning a "blue" in four consecutive years, from 1874 to 1877. Academically he graduated as BA in 1877 and MA in 1880.

He became the first player born in Africa to appear in an FA Cup final when played in the 1874 FA Cup Final for Oxford University – in the match, played against the Royal Engineers at the Kennington Oval on 14 March 1874, the University were the victors by 2 goals to 0. His brother Herbert played for the opposition.

He made his debut for the England football team on 6 March 1875 again at The Oval, in a game against Scotland, which finished 2–2. His brother Herbert won his only cap alongside him in this fixture. This was the first occasion on which two brothers played for England in the same match.

As a referee, he was awarded the 1876 FA Cup Final between the Wanderers and Old Etonians, also at The Oval, which was undecided when the first match ended 1–1 after extra time on 11 March 1876. Wanderers eventually triumphed 3–0 in the replay on 18 March 1876.

On 3 March 1877, he was honoured with the captaincy of the international side, once more against Scotland, and once again at The Oval, in a match which the Scots won 3–1. He collected just the two international caps for England.

He was on the losing side in the 1877 FA Cup Final  – the match at The Oval on 24 March was won by the Wanderers 2–1 against Oxford University.

During his career, he also played for Old Westminsters F.C. and Wanderers. He served on the FA committee from 1876 to 1877 and again in 1879.

Career outside sport
At the 1881 Census, Rawson was a schoolmaster, and lodging in Bridge Street, Brecnock St. David, Wales. He next joined the family electrical engineering business that later became Mabor Ltd, of which he was managing director by 1903.

Home life
In 1891 Rawson married Alice Maud Fife, who was later an author under the name of Maud Stepney Rawson. Having lived in London at the previous Census, he was living at Streatley, Berkshire in 1911. He died at Whitchurch, Oxfordshire on 4 November 1932 aged seventy-eight.

Sporting honours
Oxford University
FA Cup winner: 1874
FA Cup finalist: 1877

Referee
FA Cup Final: 1876

See also
 List of England international footballers born outside England

References and notes

External links

 Works by Maud Stepney Rawson

1854 births
1932 deaths
Alumni of Christ Church, Oxford
Association football defenders
England international footballers
English football referees
English footballers
South African soccer players
South African soccer referees
South African people of English descent
FA Cup Final players
FA Cup Final referees
Old Westminsters F.C. players
Oxford University A.F.C. players
People educated at Westminster School, London
South African emigrants to the United Kingdom
Sportspeople from Cape Town
Wanderers F.C. players